Congestion games are a class of games in game theory first proposed by American economist Robert W. Rosenthal in 1973. In a congestion game the payoff of each player depends on the resources it chooses and the number of players choosing the same resource. Congestion games are a special case of potential games. Rosenthal proved that any congestion game is a potential game and Monderer and Shapley (1996) proved the converse: for any potential game, there is a congestion game with the same potential function.

Motivation 
Consider a traffic net where two players originate at point  and need to get to point . However, both connection points get easily congested, meaning the more players pass through a point the greater the delay of each player becomes, so having both players go through the same connection point causes extra delay. Good outcome in this game will be for the two players to "coordinate" and pass through different connection points.   
Can such outcome be achieved? And if so, what will the cost be for each player?

Definition
Discrete congestion games are games with the following components.
 A base set of congestible elements ;
  players;
 For each element  and a vector of strategies , a load ;
 For each element , a delay function ;
 Given a strategy , player  experiences delay . Assume that each  is positive and monotone increasing.

Example
Consider the following directed graph where each player has two available strategies – going through  or going through  – leading to a total of four possibilities. The following matrix expresses the costs of the players in terms of delays depending on their choices:

Both (A,B) and (B,A) are pure Nash equilibria in this game, since any uni-lateral change by one of the players increases the cost of this player (note that the values in the table are costs, so players prefer them to be smaller).

Existence of Nash equilibria
The existence of Nash equilibria can be shown by constructing a potential function that assigns a value to each outcome.
Moreover, this construction will also show that iterated best response finds a Nash equilibrium.
Define . Note that this function is not the social welfare 
, but rather a discrete integral of sorts. The critical property of a potential function for a congestion 
game is that if one player switches strategy, the change in his delay is equal to the change in the potential function.

Elements that are in both of the strategies
This change in potential is precisely the change in delay for player ,
so  is in fact a potential function.

Fixing all but one player, any improvement in strategy by that player corresponds to
decreasing , which cannot happen at a minimum. Now since there are a finite number of configurations and each  is monotone, there exists
an equilibrium.

Continuous congestion games
In this setup, we consider players as "infinitesimally small." We keep
 a finite set of congestible elements. Instead of recognizing  players, as in the discrete case, we have  types of players,
where each type  is associated with a number , representing the rate of traffic for that type. Each type picks a strategy from 
a strategy set , which we assume are disjoint.
Finally, we allow players in a type to distribute fractionally over their strategy set.
of players in type  using strategy . Assume that .

Existence of equilibria in the continuous case
Note that strategies are now collections of strategy profiles .
For a strategy set  of size , the collection
As before, define the potential function as 
, replacing
the discrete integral with the standard one.

As a function of the strategy,
 is continuous:  is continuous, and 
 is a continuous function of the strategy. Then by the
extreme value theorem,  attains its global minimum.

a Nash equilibrium. Assume for contradiction that there exists a collection
of  that minimize  but are not a Nash equilibrium.
Then for some type , there exists some improvement  over
the current choice . That is, .
The idea now is to take a small amount  of players using strategy
 and move them to strategy . Now for any , we

less than zero. This is a contradiction, as then  was not minimized. Therefore, a minimum of  must be a Nash equilibrium.

Quality of solutions and Price of anarchy
Since there exist Nash equilibria in continuous congestion games, the next natural
topic is to analyze their quality. We will derive bounds on the ratio between
the delay at Nash and the optimal delay, otherwise known as the Price of Anarchy. First, we begin with a technical condition on the delay functions.

Definition The delay is  smooth if for all , .

.
See these lecture notes for a proof.

See also
 Potential game

References

 
Lecture notes of Michal Feldman and Noam Nisan about Potential and congestion games
.

External links
 Lecture notes of Yishay Mansour about Potential and congestion games
 ּResource allocation games  are somewhat related to congestion games.

Game theory game classes